Talasari Beach is a beach in the Baleswar district of Odisha, India. It lies on the north-eastern coast of India.

The name Talasari is derived from the two words Tala (ତାଳ) (meaning Palm) and Sari/Sarani (ସାରି/ସାରଣୀ) (meaning row). The palm trees surrounding the place gives such a name to it. The word Tala also means rhythm, which is reflected in the sea waves lapping against the shore.

Talasari is among the most beautiful and clean beaches in Odisha. This beach is situated in Odisha’s Baleswar district. The word ‘Talasari’ means a row of palm leaves in the Odia language. The rows of palm trees along the Talasari beach beautify the beach, making it among the travelling places in India. 

The flowing Subarnarekha river adds to the visual appeal of the Talasari beach by few more levels. In addition to this, The Talasari beach has sand dunes and red crabs that add features to the beach. The fishing hamlets and the mangrove trees of Bichitrapur located near this beach attract travelers to the location.

Overview

The place has vast stretches of green paddy fields, numerous rivers, blue hills and extensive beaches. The beach has tall coconut trees, palm trees and casuarina. Udaipur beach is the last beach on this stretch.

When the stream is brimming, one can only reach the main beach with the help of a boat. But at other times, one can walk across the dry riverbed. The place is fairly windy.

Talasari is one of the less exploited Odisha beaches. The Talsari beach is not as frequently visited by the people as the other beaches of Odisha. The waters of the sea at Talsari beach are not turbulent but calm and peaceful.

It is the last beach in the Odisha to the north.

Geography
Geographically Talsari is situated between 21°35'48" Northern Latitude and 87°27'17" Eastern Longitude.

Talsari's beach is famous for its fishing village, and among people partial to seafood. Near beach Digha just 7 km.

Climate
The place receives 156.84 cm rainfall throughout the year. During the summer, the temperature is high and sometimes reaches 40 °C. During the winter, the mercury stands around 14 °C.

Transport
In Odisha, Talasari is 36 km s from Jaleswar, is the nearest railway station and Kolkata is the nearest airport and is 180  km from Talsari. It's also well connected to Baleswar. From New Digha railway station, you can hire a cab / other local transport(Motor-van & Bike) to reach Talsari. It would take about 15 minutes and cost around 200rs/-.

Attractions

In February, red and orange flowers appear on the cashew trees. The cashew kernel hangs outside the fruit, which is also edible.

There are a handful of small hotels and a Panthasala run by the Odisha government.

The beach is quite flat and the waves are small and playful. The estuary of the river Subarnarekha River can be seen in the distance.

A quay has been made on the beach that serves as a fish market in the morning.

References

External links 

 Official Website of baleswar district
 
 Talasari beach, baleswar
 Talasari map
 Takearh

Cities and towns in Balasore district
Beaches of Odisha